Lucia Bassi (born 12 December 1936) is an Italian former tennis player.

Bassi, who won the singles title at the Italian Tennis Championships in 1972, featured in a total of nine Federation Cup ties for Italy, mostly as a doubles player. She was a women's doubles semifinalist at the 1963 French Championships.

See also
List of Italy Fed Cup team representatives

References

External links
 
 
 

1936 births
Living people
Italian female tennis players
20th-century Italian women